The 1942 Major League Baseball All-Star Game was the tenth playing of the midsummer classic between the all-stars of the American League (AL) and National League (NL), the two leagues comprising Major League Baseball. The game was held on July 6, 1942, at Polo Grounds in New York City the home of the New York Giants of the National League. The game resulted in the American League defeating the National League 3–1. While the game had been scheduled for a twilight start at 6:30 p.m. EWT, rain delayed the first pitch for an hour, leading to the first All-Star contest played entirely under the lights; the two-hour, seven-minute game ended just ahead of a 9:30 p.m. blackout curfew in New York.

Two nights later, the American League All-Stars traveled to Cleveland Municipal Stadium in Cleveland, Ohio, to play a special benefit game against a team of players from the U.S. Army and Navy. The contest, which the American Leaguers won 5–0, attracted a crowd of 62,094 and netted $70,000 for the Army Emergency Relief Fund and the Navy Relief Society. Mutual Radio broadcast the second game, with Bob Elson, Waite Hoyt, and Jack Graney announcing.

Rosters
Players in italics have since been inducted into the National Baseball Hall of Fame.

National League

American League

Game

Umpires

The umpires changed assignments in the middle of the fifth inning – Ballanfant and McGowan swapped positions, also Stewart and Barlick swapped positions.

Game summary

References

External links
Baseball Almanac

Major League Baseball All-Star Game
Major League Baseball All-Star Game
Baseball in New York City
Sports in Manhattan
Major League Baseball All-Star Game
Sports competitions in New York City
Major League Baseball All-Star Game
1940s in Manhattan
Washington Heights, Manhattan